This is a list of Odia films that are scheduled to release in 2022.

List of Odia films produced in the Ollywood in India that are released in the year 2022.

Jan–Mar

Apr–Jun

Jul–Sep

Oct–Dec

References

Lists of 2022 films by country or language

Lists of Ollywood films by year